This is a list of films produced by the Bollywood film 
industry based in Mumbai in 1982:

Top-grossing films
The top ten grossing films at the Indian Box Office in 
1982:

1982

Dubbed films

References

External links

1982
Bollywood
Films, Bollywood